Defending champion Andrés Molteni and his partner Máximo González defeated Sadio Doumbia and Fabien Reboul in the final, 6–4, 6–4 to win the doubles tennis title at the 2023 Córdoba Open.

Santiago González and Molteni were the reigning champions, but González chose to compete in Montpellier instead.

Seeds

Draw

Draw

References

External links
 Main draw

Córdoba Open
Córdoba Open
Cordoba Open Doubles